Devonshire Tunnel is on the closed Somerset & Dorset Joint Railway main line, between Midford and Bath Green Park railway stations, below high ground and the southern suburbs of Bath, England, emerging below the northern slopes of Combe Down village. It opened in 1874 and was named after the road called Devonshire Buildings which lie immediately above the tunnel.

It now forms one of the eponymous tunnels in the Two Tunnels Greenway.

Gradient
The tunnel had a gradient of 1 in 50, on a line where the ruling gradient was also 1 in 50.

References

Tunnels completed in 1874
Rail trail tunnels in England
Buildings and structures in Bath, Somerset
History of Bath, Somerset
Transport in Bath, Somerset
Rail transport in Somerset
Somerset and Dorset Joint Railway
Tunnels in Somerset
Footpaths in Somerset
Combe Down